Russian Insurgent Army (РПА; RPA) is a paramilitary organization established on December 29, 2014, in Kyiv. The RPA is an organization of Russian refugees and emigrants who fight on the side of Ukraine as part of volunteer battalions.

On January 22, 2015, at the request of the Russian Prosecutor General's Office, the video "Creation of the Russian Insurgent Army (RPA)" was added to the register of banned sites on YouTube for "calls to fight the Putin regime with weapons in hand". On January 28, 2015, Roskomnadzor added YouTube video hosting site to the register of banned websites. During the same day, the video "Creation of the Russian Insurgent Army (RPA)" was removed from YouTube, after which the YouTube was unlocked in Russia.

The RPA positions itself as the "army of the Russian opposition" in the confrontation between the opposition and the Russian government. The organization conducts underground activities in the territory of the Russian Federation.

The requirements and goals of the RPA are set out in the manifesto:
The overthrow of the Putin regime and the neo-Soviet nomenklatura, based on the power of violence and oppression, which appropriated the wealth and resources of the peoples of Russia;
The cessation of the war in Ukraine and any attempts by revanchist forces to incite interethnic conflicts in the post-Soviet space;
Consolidation of the national sovereignty of the Russian people in the Russian Federation and in the world.

Basic principles
The RPA lays the following basic principles in the basis of the new statehood of the peoples of Russia:
Equality of all peoples of the Russian Federation and their right to real national development, self-determination and state independence.
Genuine federalization of Russia. Return of the election of power at all levels. The main legislative body of the Russian Federation is the Parliament.
Assignment of land to the Russian people not to the detriment of the interests of other peoples of Russia. Russian national representation in the federal government – Parliament.
Preservation of peace and establishment of friendly relations with all countries and comprehensive development of international cooperation. Granting the right to national republics within the Russian Federation to independently choose economic cooperation and development.
Decommunization.
Economic liberalization, reforms and transformations aimed at reducing the gap between rich and poor to enrich the nation and each citizen in particular. Creating conditions for free trade and competition.
Free sale of land to citizens of RF. Land amnesty. Everything that is on the ground and underground, the subsoil, belongs to the owner and only to the owner.
Consolidation of the inviolability of the right of private property and the results of work. Inadmissibility of privatization review. Reducing the share of the state in the economy. Elimination of monopolies. Privatization of state-owned companies and sale of state property to citizens of the Russian Federation.
Equality to the law, regardless of merit before the state. No one has the right to demand elevated rights or other treatment on the basis of their declared uniqueness. Equal access to basic education and medical care.
Every citizen of the Russian Federation has the right to protection of his life, family and property. Free sale of weapons.
Freedom of speech and assembly. No one has the right to be convicted for words and thoughts.
The Russian Federation is a secular state. The church is separated from the state. No religion can be established as state or mandatory. Religious organizations do not have the right to support by state institutions and are obliged to carry out their activities based only on their own resources.
Lustration, under which no one can be convicted of working in government agencies under the Putin regime, but will have to leave his post and report on the nature of his income, the legitimacy of his decisions and violations of the law.

Direct actions
October 27, 2016, An arson attack on the headquarters of the "Troll Factory" in St. Petersburg was claimed by the RPA although there was a Molotov cocktail attack the night before on October 26.
November 16, 2016, Arson of the house of the governor of the Volgograd region Andrey Bocharov.
March 2, 2017, Murder of the former United Russia deputy of the Iskitim district of the city of Berdsk, Vladimir Shevtsov.

See also
Freedom of Russia Legion
National Republican Army (Russia)
Russian Volunteer Corps

References

2014 establishments in Ukraine
Anti-communism in Ukraine
Anti-communist organizations in Russia
Insurgent groups in Europe
Military units and formations established in 2014
Military units and formations of the Russo-Ukrainian War
National liberation armies
Opposition to Vladimir Putin
Paramilitary organizations based in Ukraine
Military units and formations of the 2022 Russian invasion of Ukraine